Laketown Moravian Brethren's Church (also known as Lake Auburn Moravian Church) is a historic church on County Highway 11 in Victoria, Minnesota, United States.

The congregation was organized on October 31, 1858, at the house of John Holtmeier. In 1860 a log church was built on land that Holtmeier donated to the congregation. In 1878, a brick church was built near the previous site, at a cost of $2500, with 74 members in the congregation.

The church was added to the National Register of Historic Places in 1980.  It was nominated for being a well-preserved example of rural vernacular religious architecture, marking a transition between the spartan frame designs of Carver County's earliest churches and its elaborate later churches of brick.

See also 
 Zoar Moravian Church: nearby church also on the NRHP

References

Churches on the National Register of Historic Places in Minnesota
Churches completed in 1878
Churches in Carver County, Minnesota
National Register of Historic Places in Carver County, Minnesota
1878 establishments in Minnesota
Vernacular architecture in Minnesota
Moravian churches in the United States